Ukraina is a Ukrainian  originally ordered by the Soviet Union in the early 1980s under the name Admiral Flota Lobov. After the Soviet Union disbanded in the early 1990s, the ship passed on to Russia and then to Ukraine, assuming the name Ukraina. In 2010 the Ukrainian parliament stripped the ship of its name. The ship remains unfinished and is currently moored at the Mykolayiv Shipyard (former 61 Kommunara Shipbuilding Plant).

History
The ship was laid down in 1983 and launched in 1990 just before the fall of the Soviet Union. Due to budget constraints work on the cruiser stopped in the early 1990s and the ship was left unfinished. In 1993 the cruiser was withdrawn from the Russian Navy and passed to Ukraine. In 1997 Ukraine stated that it had no need for the cruiser and was willing to sell it. Russia was unwilling to buy the cruiser, China and India were then approached but showed no interest at the time. In addition, the U.S. government has asked the Ukrainian government to stop supplying military technology to China in exchange for NATO accession and economic assistance. According to Ukrainian sources in 2007 the cruiser needed 30 million dollars to be finished.

Status
The cruiser sits docked and unfinished at the harbor of Mykolaiv in southern Ukraine.

In April 2010, sources from the Russian defense committee claimed that Russia had plans to buy the unfinished cruiser from Ukraine. In May 2010, after talks with Russian president Dmitry Medvedev in Kyiv, Ukrainian president Viktor Yanukovych stated that they had come to an agreement to finish the ship together. On 21 January 2011, Russian navy sources stated that Russia was only interested in obtaining the cruiser if they could have it free of charge. By early March 2011, Russian defence minister Anatoly Serdiukov stated that Russia was still waiting for an acceptable offer from Ukraine, regarding potential procurement of the missile cruiser. His Ukrainian counterpart Mikhail Yezhel responded that he would not scrap a 95% complete warship, and that the issue would be resolved in the near future.

It was reported that the Ukrainian government invested 6.08 million UAH into the ship's maintenance in 2012.

On 26 March 2017, it was announced that the Ukrainian Government would be scrapping the vessel which has been laid up, incomplete, for nearly 30 years in Mykolaiv. Maintenance and construction was costing the country US$225,000 per month.

On 18 August 2018, it was reported that Brazil was interested in acquiring the ship, have it undergo extensive modernization and transfer it to the Brazilian Navy.

On 19 September 2019, the new director of Ukroboronprom Aivaras Abromavičius announced that the ship would be sold. However, according to satellite imagery, the ship remains untouched as of August 2022.

References

External links

Cold War cruisers of the Soviet Union
Slava-class cruisers of the Ukrainian Navy
Ships built at Shipyard named after 61 Communards
1990 ships
Ships built in the Soviet Union